War and the Woman is a 1917 silent war drama film directed by Ernest C. Warde and starring Florence La Badie, Ernest C. Warde and Tom Brooke.

Cast
 Florence La Badie as Ruth Norton—Braun's Stepdaughter 
 Ernest C. Warde as Lieutenant Fredericks 
 Tom Brooke as John Braun 
 Wayne Arey as John Barker 
 Grace Henderson as Barker's Mother 
 Arthur Bauer as Commander of Invading Army

References

Bibliography
 Robert T. Eberwein. The War Film. Rutgers University Press, 2004.

External links
 

1917 films
1910s war drama films
American war drama films
1910s English-language films
American silent feature films
American black-and-white films
Films directed by Ernest C. Warde
Pathé Exchange films
1917 drama films
1910s American films
Silent American drama films
Silent war drama films